Paideia (also spelled paedeia) (/paɪˈdeɪə/; Greek: παιδεία) referred to the rearing and education of the ideal member of the ancient Greek polis or state. These educational ideals later spread to the Greco-Roman world at large, and were called humanitas in Latin. Paideia was meant to instill aristocratic virtues in the young citizen men who were trained in this way. An ideal man within the polis would be well-rounded, refined in intellect, morals, and physicality, so training of both the body and mind was important. Both practical, subject-based schooling as well as a focus upon the socialization of individuals within the aristocratic order of the polis were a part of this training. The practical aspects of paideia included subjects within the modern designation of the liberal arts (e.g. rhetoric, grammar, and philosophy), as well as scientific disciplines like arithmetic and medicine. Gymnastics and wrestling were valued for their effect on the body alongside the moral education which was imparted by the study of music, poetry, and philosophy. This approach to the rearing of a well-rounded Greek male was common to the Greek-speaking world, with the exception of Sparta where agoge was practiced.

The idea of paideia in ancient and modern cultures
The Greeks considered paideia to be carried out by the aristocratic class, who tended to intellectualize their culture and their ideas. The culture and the youth were formed to the ideal of kalos kagathos ("beautiful and good").

Aristotle gives his paideia proposal in Book VIII of the Politics. In this, he says that, "education ought to be adapted to the particular form of constitution, since the particular character belonging to each constitution both guards the constitution generally and originally establishes it..." As a result, Aristotle argues that education should be a public system, not left up to individuals. He goes on to deliberate about what a proper education should entail, weighing different subjects, such as music and drawing, against their benefit towards cultivating virtue. He lists the ways he believes that gymnastic training should be carried out, bringing up some Spartan practices in order to see the benefits and drawbacks of their system. He talks extensively about music and its place in education, ultimately concluding that it should be included, but that there should be specific instruction, "in what times and what rhythms they should take part, and also what kinds of instruments should be used in their studies, as this naturally makes a difference."

In modern discourse, the German-American classicist Werner Jaeger wrote Paideia: The Ideals of Greek Culture, using the concept of paideia to trace the development of Greek thought and education from Homer to Demosthenes. Encyclopedist and Aristotelian philosopher Mortimer Adler gives a paideia proposal in his criticism of contemporary Western educational systems.  Lawrence A. Cremin did so in his histories of American education.

Isocrates' influence
Isocrates''' paideia was quite influential, particularly in Athens. Isocrates' goal was to construct a practice of education and politics that brought validity in the democratic deliberative practice while remaining intellectually respectable. Isocrates sought to encourage a love of wisdom in his audience by making them apply a principle of intellectual consistency to their lives. The fundamental aspect of his paideia was consistency on the individual, civic, and panhellenic levels.

Sayings and proverbs that defined paideia
 "Know thyself" and "Nothing in excess" 
 "Hard is the Good."

See also
 Arete Classical education
 The Paideia School

Notes

References
 Werner Jaeger, Paideia: The Ideals of Greek Culture, vols. I–III, trans. Gilbert Highet, Oxford University Press, 1945.
 Oxford English Dictionary, "Paedeia." 2005.

Further reading
 Takis Fotopoulos, "From (mis)-education to Paideia", The International Journal of Inclusive Democracy'', vol 2, no 1, (2005).

Ancient Greek culture
Education in classical antiquity